Two ships of the Royal Navy were named Macbeth -

 , a minesweeper that was sold into civil service post-World War I and was lost in 1930 near Île-d'Houat.
 , a naval trawler in service during World War II

References

Royal Navy ship names